A puftaloon is a fried scone, a kind of quick bread, most often cooked in Australia. Popular with children in winter, they are made from flour, salt, butter and milk, and traditionally fried in dripping (rendered animal fat).

Puftaloons are also known as johnnycakes, mentioned in the Australian folk song "Four Little Johnny Cakes", in which an itinerant sheep shearer describes the food at his riverside camp:

"With my little round flour-bag sitting on a stump, / My little tea-and-sugar bag looking nice and plump,
A little fat cod-fish just off the hook, / And four little johnny-cakes, a credit to the cook".

See also
 List of quick breads

Sources

References 

Quick breads
Australian breads
Australian cuisine